Giagithu is a settlement in Kenya's Central Province. It is approximately 21 km from the country's capital, Nairobi.

References 

Populated places in Central Province (Kenya)